The yellow-throated white-eye (Zosterops metcalfii) is a species of bird in the family Zosteropidae. It is found in the Solomon Islands archipelago (Bougainville, Choiseul, Santa Isabel and Nggela Islands).

References 

yellow-throated white-eye
Birds of Bougainville Island
Birds of the Solomon Islands
yellow-throated white-eye
Taxa named by Henry Baker Tristram
Taxonomy articles created by Polbot